= Puerto Rico Chamber of Marketing, Industry, and Distribution of Food =

Organization

- Founded: 2003 (23 years ago)
- Type: trade association
- Purpose: food industry and related ancillary businesses
- Location: Guaynabo, Puerto Rico
- Region served: Puerto Rico
- Website: www.midapr.com

The Puerto Rico Chamber of Marketing, Industry, and Distribution of Food —Spanish: Cámara de Mercadeo, Industria y Distribución de Alimentos de Puerto Rico (MIDA)— is a private, voluntary, and non-profit trade association that advocates for the food industry and ancillary businesses in Puerto Rico. The chamber was founded in 2003 by merging the Puerto Rico Chamber of Wholesale Traders and the Puerto Rico Association of Wholesalers, Importers, and Food Distributors.

The chamber is constituted by the major supermarket chains doing in Puerto Rico, retail food shops, small chains and independent supermarkets, and wholesalers. The chamber also represents food distributors, distributors of soft drinks, spirits and beer, as well as a wide range of products that are sold in supermarkets and retail outlets, and wholesalers whose line of business is outside the food industry. The latter include beauty products, household products, magazines, candy, and stationery.

The chamber does some tracking and research of inflation on goods sold on the island of Puerto Rico and provides its findings also on the island's hurricane-readiness.
